{{Infobox Boxingmatch
| Fight Name    = Will to Win
| fight date    = October 6, 2007
| image         = 
| location      = Mandalay Bay Events Center, Paradise, Nevada, U.S.
| titles        =  WBC International super featherweight title
| fighter1      = Manny Pacquiao
| nickname1     = Pac-Man
| record1       = 44–3–2 (35 KO)
| hometown1     = General Santos, Philippines
| height1       = 5 ft 6+1/2 in
| style1 = Southpaw
| weight1 = 130 lb
| recognition1  =  WBC International super featherweight champion [[The Ring (magazine)|The Ring]] No. 2 ranked pound-for-pound fighter3-division world champion
| fighter2      = Marco Antonio Barrera 
| nickname2     = Baby-Faced Assassin
| record2       = 63–5–0–1 (42 KO)
| hometown2     = Mexico City, Mexico
| height2       = 5 ft 6 in
|style2 = Orthodox
|weight2 = 130 lbs
| recognition2  = 3-division world champion
| result        =  Pacquiao wins via 12-round unanimous decision (118-109, 118-109, 115-112)
}}
Manny Pacquiao vs. Marco Antonio Barrera II, billed as Will to Win'', was a super featherweight boxing match. The bout took place on October 6, 2007, at the Mandalay Bay, Las Vegas, Nevada, United States and was distributed by HBO PPV. The fight was announced after Top Rank and Golden Boy Promotions settled their lawsuit over the promotional rights for Pacquiao fights on June 29, 2007.

Barrera came out smarter in this fight as he survived up to the final round but Pacquiao easily outboxed him throughout the fight. Pacquiao defeated Barrera via unanimous decision. Two judges scored the bout 118–109, whereas the third scored it 115–112.

Barrera briefly retired after the fight and returned over a year later in November 2008 to face Sammy Ventura.

References

Barrera
2007 in boxing
Boxing in Las Vegas
2007 in sports in Nevada
Boxing on HBO
October 2007 sports events in the United States